Rehmeyer's Hollow (also known as Hex Hollow) is the nickname for a private property that is located in Stewartstown, Pennsylvania, northeast of Shrewsbury. The area was brought to national attention by a murder that occurred there in 1928.

Murder of Nelson Rehmeyer 
In 1928, under the malicious advice of a local woman popularly known as Nellie Noll but actually named Emma Knopp, John Blymire believed that he had been cursed by Nelson Rehmeyer. Blymire and his accomplices called on Rehmeyer at his home hoping to find his copy of the braucherei 'spell book' known as the Long Lost Friend and also get a lock of his hair. Knopp advised him to burn the book and bury the lock of hair eight feet underground. Blymire and his fellow conspirators John Curry and Wilbert Hess (who likewise felt victimized by Rehmeyer) were unable to find the book, then confronted Rehmeyer whom they killed and mutilated in hopes that this would lift the curse. The three men charged with the crime also set fire to the house, hoping to remove remnants of the curse, as well as to destroy evidence of their murder. However, the house did not burn down as they had hoped. This led to many people further believing that Rehmeyer was a witch and that his power prevented the destruction of the house. The resulting trial drew substantial media attention.

Rehmeyer's house where he was murdered still stands on Rehmeyer's Hollow Road. Many locals believe it to be haunted.  Teenagers can usually be found legend tripping down in the hollow.

References

Further reading 
 
 

Pennsylvania Dutch Powwow website of author Robert Phoenix 

Hex Hollow, documentary film (2015) https://m.imdb.com/title/tt3145016/?ref_=nv_sr_srsg_0 

Geography of York County, Pennsylvania